The 2011 Asian Women's Club Volleyball Championship was the 12th staging of the AVC Club Championships. The tournament was held in Vĩnh Phúc Gymnasium, Vĩnh Yên, Vĩnh Phúc Province, Vietnam.

Pools composition
The teams are seeded based on their final ranking at the 2010 Asian Women's Club Volleyball Championship.

Preliminary round

Pool A

|}

|}

Pool B

|}

|}

Final round

Quarterfinals

|}

5th–8th semifinals

|}

Semifinals

|}

7th place

|}

5th place

|}

3rd place

|}

Final

|}

Final standing

Awards
MVP:  Wilavan Apinyapong (Chang)
Best Scorer:  Lyudmila Anarbayeva (Zhetyssu)
Best Spiker:  Yin Na (Tianjin)
Best Blocker:  Phạm Thị Kim Huệ (Thông tin LVPB)
Best Server:  Nootsara Tomkom (Chang)
Best Setter:  Yao Di (Tianjin)
Best Libero:  Piyanut Pannoy (Chang)

References

External links
Asian Volleyball Confederation

Asian Women's Club Volleyball Championship
Asian Women's Club Volleyball Championship
2011 Asian Women's Club Volleyball Championship